Cremenaga is a comune (municipality) in the Province of Varese in the Italian region Lombardy, located about  northwest of Milan and about  north of Varese, on the border with Switzerland.

The municipality of Cremenaga contains the frazioni (subdivisions, mainly villages and hamlets) Sasso del Castello, Mirabello, Campagna, Monte Sette Termini (i Bedeloni), and Cascina Porsù.

Cremenaga borders the following municipalities: Cadegliano-Viconago, Cugliate-Fabiasco, Luino, Monteggio (Switzerland), Montegrino Valtravaglia.

Demographic evolution

References

Cities and towns in Lombardy